Physarina is a genus of slime molds in the family Physaraceae.

Species
The following species are accepted by Species Fungorum:
Physarina alboscabra Nann.-Bremek. & Y. Yamam.
Physarina echinocephala Höhn.
Physarina echinospora K.S. Thind & Manocha

References

Amoebozoa genera
Physaraceae